Devoe or DeVoe is both a given name and surname. Notable people with the name include:

Devoe Joseph (born 1989), Canadian basketball player
Alexander Devoe (1905–1933), American movie producer
Charles Devoe (1982–2010), American model
David DeVoe (born 1947), American businessman
Don DeVoe (born 1941), American basketball coach
Ellen DeVoe (BA 1986), American social work professor
Emma Smith DeVoe (1848–1927), American suffragist
Josh Devoe (1888–1979), American baseball player
Lester DeVoe, American musician
Michael Devoe (born 1999), American basketball player
Ronnie DeVoe (born 1967), American singer
Todd Devoe (born 1980), American football player
Clifford DeVoe, supervillain appearing in American comic books published by DC Comics

See also
Vance DeVoe Brand (born 1931), American astronaut
Garfield Devoe Rogers Sr., American philanthropist

English-language surnames